Kitagō, Miyazaki may refer to the following places in Miyazaki Prefecture, Japan:

Kitagō, Miyazaki (Minaminaka), a former town located in Minaminaka District
Kitagō, Miyazaki (Higashiusuki), a former village located in Higashiusuki District